Martin Parniske is a German biologist with a specialisation in genetics, microbiology and biochemistry. He is university professor and head of the Institute of Genetics at the Faculty of Biology of the Ludwig Maximilian University of Munich. Parniske's scientific focus is on the molecular interaction between plants and symbiotic and pathogenic organisms including bacteria, fungi, oomycetes and insects.

Biography
Parniske studied biology, microbiology, biochemistry and genetics at the universities of Konstanz and Marburg, Germany. From 1986 until 1991 he performed diploma and doctoral studies in the laboratory of Dietrich Werner on chemical communication of the root with the bacterial microbiome with a focus on flavonoids and isoflavonoids. From 1992 until 1994 Parniske carried out biochemical studies on the interaction of plant transcription factors and DNA at the Institute of Biochemistry of the Max Planck Institute for Plant Breeding Research in Cologne, Germany as a postdoctoral fellow funded by the German Research Foundation. From 1994 until 1998 he studied the evolution of plant disease resistance genes in the lab of Jonathan D. G. Jones. In 1998, Parniske was appointed as an independent group leader at the Sainsbury Laboratory in Norwich, UK. In 2004 he accepted a call for the chair of Genetics at the Faculty of Biology of the Ludwig Maximilian University of Munich. From 2011 until 2013 he acted as the Dean of the Faculty of Biology of the LMU Munich. As the head of the Institute of Genetics at the Faculty of Biology of the LMU Munich, Martin Parniske teaches students at the Bachelor, Master and Doctoral (Dr. rer. nat.) level. Topics taught include Genetics, Molecular Plant-Microbe Interactions, Genetics and Society, Plant Nutrition and Sustainable Food Production.

Scientific contribution

Genetics of plant root endosymbiosis
Parniske identified a set of plant mutants defective in plant root symbioses with both arbuscular mycorrhiza fungi and nitrogen-fixing rhizobia bacteria. These mutants enforced the idea that plant root endosymbioses with bacteria and fungi share a common genetic basis. Because arbuscular mycorrhiza dates back to the first land plant and the root nodule symbiosis is much younger, this common gene set revealed that the nitrogen-fixing root nodule symbiosis evolved by co-opting genes from the existing arbuscular mycorrhizasymbiosis. By map-based identification of so-called “common symbiosis genes”, the Parniske lab contributed to the identification of several components directly or indirectly involved in a plant signal transduction process required for both symbioses. These include a receptor-like kinase, nucleoporins, potassium channels required for nuclear calcium oscillations and a nuclear localized complex comprising a calcium-and-calmodulin dependent protein kinase and its phosphorylation target CYCLOPS, a DNA-binding transcriptional activator. The discovery of these genes and the postulated signal transduction processes had a major impact on this research field. The Parniske lab discovered that CYCLOPS is an interactor and phosphorylation substrate of the calcium- and calmodulin-dependent protein kinase CCaMK. Moreover, the role of CYCLOPS, initially annotated as a protein with unknown function, was identified as a DNA-binding transcriptional activator. Research in the Parniske lab clarified the role of the CCaMK/CYCLOPS complex as a major regulatory hub in symbiotic signal transduction.

Evolution of plant disease resistance genes
Parniske joined the laboratory of the plant geneticist Jonathan D.G. Jones at the Sainsbury Laboratory in Norwich, United Kingdom in November 1994. He addressed the fundamental question in plant disease resistance research, how plants can keep pace with the evolutionary speed of microbial pathogens that have a much shorter generation time than their host plants and thus evade recognition by plant receptors through diversifying selection. Parniske discovered that recombination within and between resistance gene clusters is a key to the evolution of novel recognition specificities of pathogenic microbes by plants.

Chemical communication between bacteria and plant roots
During his doctoral work Parniske observed that incompatible genotypes of soybean and rhizobia can lead to the induction of defense responses inside root nodules including the accumulation of phytoalexins, plant toxins produced upon biotic stress. Parniske discovered that the soybean phytoalexin glyceollin is toxic for soybean rhizobia and that low concentrations of isoflavonoids secreted by soybean roots induce a resistance against this antibiotic plant compound.

Awards  
In 2013 Parniske received the European Research Council Advanced Grant for research on the “Evolution of the molecular mechanisms underlying the nitrogen-fixing root nodule symbiosis”. He received postdoctoral fellowships from the German Research Foundation (DFG), the EMBO and the European Union. In 2014 Parniske received the Thomson Reuters Highly Cited Researcher award in recognition of ranking among the top 1% of researchers for most cited documents in the field of animal and plant sciences.

Selected publications
 List of publications, Research Gate
 List of publications, ORCID
 List of publications Thomson Reuters Researcher ID

External links
 Martin Parniske LMU Munich

References 

Living people
21st-century German biologists
German geneticists
Year of birth missing (living people)
Academic staff of the Ludwig Maximilian University of Munich